The 63rd ceremony of the British Academy Film Awards, given by the British Academy of Film and Television Arts, took place on 21 February 2010 and honoured the best films of 2009.

Winners and nominees

BAFTA Fellowship
 Vanessa Redgrave

Statistics

See also
 82nd Academy Awards
 35th César Awards
 15th Critics' Choice Awards
 62nd Directors Guild of America Awards
 23rd European Film Awards
 67th Golden Globe Awards
 30th Golden Raspberry Awards
 24th Goya Awards
 25th Independent Spirit Awards
 15th Lumières Awards
 21st Producers Guild of America Awards
 14th Satellite Awards
 36th Saturn Awards
 16th Screen Actors Guild Awards
 62nd Writers Guild of America Awards

References

External links
 Bafta Gallery 2010

Film063
2009 film awards
2010 in British cinema
2010 in London
Royal Opera House
February 2010 events in the United Kingdom
2009 awards in the United Kingdom